A hold (abbreviated HLD, H or HD) is awarded to a relief pitcher who meets the following three conditions:

1. Enters the game in a save situation; that is, when all of the following three conditions apply:
 (a) He appears in relief (i.e., is not the starting pitcher) when his team is leading; and
 (b) He is not the winning pitcher; and
 (c) He qualifies under one of the following conditions:
 (i) He enters the game with a lead of no more than three runs and maintains that lead for at least one inning
 (ii) He enters the game with the potential tying run either on base, or at bat, or on deck
 (iii) He pitches for at least three innings;

2. Records at least one out;

3. Leaves the game before it has ended without his team having relinquished the lead at any point and does not record a save.

The hold is not an official Major League Baseball statistic.

Description
Unlike saves, wins, and losses, more than one pitcher per team can earn a hold for a game, though it is not possible for a pitcher to receive more than one hold in a given game. A pitcher can receive a hold by protecting a lead even if that lead is lost by a later pitcher after his exit.

While middle relievers earn their share, holds are most often credited to setup pitchers.

In 1994, PA SportsTicker created an alternate definition for a hold, removing the requirement that a pitcher needs to make an out in order to record a hold. In 2009, STATS LLC purchased PA SportsTicker, and the alternate definition is no longer in use.

While holds are not an official MLB statistic, they are increasingly visible in many box scores, including espn.com and MLB.com. Many fantasy baseball providers also include holds as an optional category that can be included in customized leagues.

Career leaders
The career leaders are listed based on total holds according to MLB.com, which only records the statistic from 1999 onwards.

Stats updated through the end of the 2022 season.

Baseball statistics sites such as Baseball-Reference.com and The Baseball Cube credit holds to players in games played before 1999 based on the record of the game situation when the pitcher entered and left the game.  However, the hold totals do not always agree from site to site, or with MLB.com from 1999 onward.

The following players who began their Major League careers before 1999 would be among the career leaders if MLB had recorded the statistic in games before the 1999 season.  They are listed here with hold totals as calculated by Baseball-Reference.com.

** as calculated by Baseball-reference.com to include years before 1999.

Single season record
The single-season MLB record for holds is 41, established by Joel Peralta in 2013 pitching for the Tampa Bay Rays and equaled by Tony Watson in 2015 pitching for the Pittsburgh Pirates. Peralta surpassed the previous record of 40 holds set by Luke Gregerson in 2010 with the San Diego Padres.

See also
Baseball statistics

References

Pitching statistics